Acromyrmex diasi is a species of leaf-cutter ant, a New World ant of the subfamily Myrmicinae of the genus Acromyrmex. It is found in the wild naturally in Brazil.

See also
List of leafcutter ants

References

Acromyrmex
Insects described in 1983
Hymenoptera of South America